The English Cornett & Sackbut Ensemble are an early music group specializing in music for cornett and sackbut. Formed in 1993, they perform in early music concerts and festivals on period instruments.

St John's, Smith Square is amongst the venues at which they have performed. Festivals include the York Early Music Festival.

In 2018 they are working with the National Centre for Early Music to run the NCEM Young Composers Award.

Discography
Recorded works include:
2017: Montiverdi: the other vespers
2014: The Spy's Choirbook by Alamire; with David Skinner under the Obsidian records label
2013: Cantiones Sacrae Octonis Vocibus by Peter Philips; with the Choir of Royal Holloway under the Hyperion label
2002: Byrd - the Great Service in the Chapel Royal, with Steven Devine under the Chaconne label
2001: Accendo, with music from Claudio Monteverdi, under the Deux-Elles label

Awards
 2015 Gramophone Classical Music Awards:Early music, for The Spy's Choirbook by Alamire; with David Skinner under the Obsidian records label.

References

External links

The English Cornett and Sackbut Ensemble on youtube

Early music consorts
Historically informed performance